The Sisterhood of the Traveling Pants is a 2005 American comedy-drama film directed by Ken Kwapis from a screenplay by Delia Ephron and Elizabeth Chandler, based on the 2001 novel of the same name by Ann Brashares. The film stars America Ferrera, Amber Tamblyn, Blake Lively, and Alexis Bledel. The story follows four best friends who buy a mysterious pair of pants that fits each of them despite their differing sizes. The girls share the pants equally as they spend their first summer apart.

The Sisterhood of the Traveling Pants was released in the United States on June 1, 2005, by Warner Bros. Pictures. A sequel, The Sisterhood of the Traveling Pants 2 was released on August 6, 2008, while a third film is in development. A musical adaptation based on the film is also in development.

Plot
Lena Kaligaris, Tibby Rollins, Carmen Lowell, and Bridget Vreeland are teenagers from Bethesda, Maryland, who have been best friends their whole lives. The girls are about to spend their first summer apart: Lena is visiting her grandparents in Santorini, Greece; Bridget is going to soccer camp in Baja California, Mexico; Carmen is visiting her father in South Carolina; and Tibby is staying home. While shopping together, the girls find a pair of jeans that inexplicably fit them all perfectly. The girls decide to share the jeans equally over the summer, before parting the next day.

While wearing the Pants, Lena nearly drowns, but a local Greek boy, Kostas Dounas, rescues her. Lena later learns from her grandmother that her and Kostas' families are enemies. Kostas pursues Lena, saying that the dispute between their families has nothing to do with them. Lena initially rebuffs Kostas' advances, but eventually begins a secret relationship with him. Later, Kostas tells Lena that he loves her, but her family interrupts and drags her away before she can answer. Lena appeals to her grandfather, who agrees to allow her to see Kostas before he leaves for Athens.

Working at a discount department store, Tibby finds a young girl, Bailey Graffman, has fainted and calls an ambulance. Later, Bailey delivers the pants to Tibby's house after they are accidentally delivered to her home by mistake. Fascinated by Tibby's self-made film, Bailey appoints herself as Tibby's assistant. Initially annoyed, Tibby grows to accept Bailey, and learns that Bailey has leukemia. When Bailey again is taken to the hospital, Tibby avoids her for a while, but eventually visits her with the pants. She pleads with Bailey to take them, but Bailey says the pants have already worked their magic by bringing her and Tibby together. Tibby continues to spend time with Bailey in the hospital, until she eventually passes away overnight. She decides to make a film inspired by Bailey.

Carmen arrives in South Carolina, only to discover that her father, Al, is about to marry Lydia, who has two children around Carmen's age: Paul and Krista. They are blonde WASPs, unlike Carmen, who was raised by her Catholic, Puerto Rican mother. Although Carmen's father and step-family initially seem welcoming, they emotionally neglect her. Carmen feels uncomfortable with her father referring to Paul and Krista as his kids, and resents him being an enthusiastic, present father to them while he has usually been absent in her life. Carmen is embarrassed at a dress shop when she tries on the bridesmaid dress picked out for her for the wedding, which is too small and unflattering to her voluptuous figure. Angered when the saleswoman calls her, "the other one," Carmen shouts at Lydia and runs away. She eventually takes a taxi home and assumes her father and Lydia are out looking for her, but finds them happily enjoying dinner together in their dining room, apparently unconcerned that she's missing. Carmen throws a stone through their dining room window and returns to Maryland. When Carmen returns home, Tibby tries to help Carmen with her feelings toward her father. Carmen lashes out at Tibby, who leaves in tears, though they eventually reconcile. Tibby convinces Carmen to confront her father with a phone call, during which she finally reveals her feelings of neglect and abandonment. He apologizes sincerely, but Carmen tells him it isn't enough.

Arriving at soccer camp, Bridget develops a crush on coach Eric Richman. Despite relationships between coaches and campers being forbidden, Bridget flirts with Eric, and tries to seek his attention during games. When Bridget's turn with the Pants begins, she leads Eric to the beach at night where they have sex and she loses her virginity. Bridget becomes depressed afterwards, and isolates herself when she returns home. After hearing about what happened in a letter, Lena calls Carmen and Tibby, and they go to Bridget's house. Bridget worries she is like her mother, whose mood swings and mental issues culminated in deep depression and her suicide. However, Carmen and Tibby reassure Bridget that she is stronger than her mother and comfort her with happy memories of her mother. On his way back to Columbia University, Eric visits and apologizes to Bridget for his behavior and expresses his hope that she will give him a chance when she is older.

The girls meet Lena at the airport and drive to South Carolina to attend Carmen's father's wedding, despite Carmen's reluctance. Carmen's father publicly apologizes for neglecting her. Carmen accepts his apology and joins the blended family onstage for the ceremony.

Cast
Amber Tamblyn as Tabitha "Tibby" Tomko-Rollins
Victoria Tennant as Young Tibby 
Alexis Bledel as Lena Kaligaris
 Alanna Dawn Ekkert as Young Lena 
America Ferrera as Carmen Lowell
 Tiara Santana as Young Carmen 
Blake Lively as Bridget Vreeland
Ashley Hale as Young Bridget  
Bradley Whitford as Albert "Al" Lowell, Carmen's father
Jenna Boyd as Bailey Graffman
Nancy Travis as Lydia Rodman, Carmen's stepmother
Erica Hubbard as Soccer Pal Diana
Kyle Schmid as Paul Rodman, Carmen's stepbrother
Mike Vogel as Eric Richman
Michael Rady as Kostas Dounas
Kristie Marsden as Soccer Pal Olivia
Emily Tennant as Krista Rodman, Carmen's stepsister
Leonardo Nam as Brian McBrian
Rachel Ticotin as Christina
Maria Konstandarou as Yia Yia, Lena's maternal grandmother
George Touliatos as Papou, Lena's maternal grandfather
Ernie Lively as Franz Vreeland

Production
Principal photography started on May 17, 2004. Filming began on the island of Santorini, Greece. Filming then continued in Cabo San Lucas, Mexico.

The film was partially shot in the Kamloops and Ashcroft area in British Columbia, Canada.

Reception and legacy

Critical response
On Rotten Tomatoes, the film has an approval rating of 82% based on 153 reviews, with an average rating of 6.7/10. The site's critical consensus reads "This adaptation of a beloved novel charms with its heartwarming tale of friendship and young adulthood; realistic portrayals of the lives of teenage girls lend the comedy drama sincerity, and may capture hearts outside the female-centric demographic." Metacritic gives the film a weighted average score of 66 out of 100 based on 34 reviews, indicating "generally favorable reviews".  Audiences polled by CinemaScore gave the film an average grade of "A-" on an A+ to F scale. 

Shondaland mentioned in its review of the film that Bridget's white underwear (seen in the trial scene at the beginning of the film) was iconic.

Box office 
On its opening weekend, the film opened #5 at the box office with $9,833,340. As of November 14, 2008, the film has grossed $42,013,878 worldwide.

Legacy

Demi Adejuyigbe has mentioned that he coerced director Malcolm D. Lee to have characters from the film appear as background cameos in Space Jam: A New Legacy. Though not confirmed, this was likely a joke given that Adejuyigbe comically suggested to “decide how much of this anecdote is real.”

Home media

The DVD and VHS were released in the US on October 11, 2005. The film has yet to be released on Blu-ray.

Soundtrack and score

The song album was released by Columbia Records on May 24, 2005.

 "These Days" – Chantal Kreviazuk (3:57)
 "Unwritten" – Natasha Bedingfield (4:19)
 "Time of Our Lives" – Paul van Dyk (3:37)
 "Black Roses Red" – Alana Grace (4:12)
 "If God Made You" (Radio Remix) – Five for Fighting (4:16)
 "Just for You" – William Tell (3:46)
 "Closer to You" – Brandi Carlile (2:54)
 "No Sleep Tonight" – The Faders (3:00)
 "I Want You to Know" – Chantal Kreviazuk (3:19)
 "Be Be Your Love" – Rachael Yamagata (4:14)
 "Sun's Gonna Rise" – Shannon Curfman (3:55)
 "Simple" – Katy Perry (3:39)
 "Always There in You" – Valli Girls (an early track involving members of HAIM)(3:46)

The album of Cliff Eidelman's score was released by Varèse Sarabande on July 12, 2005.

 "Prologue" (3:44)
 "Deja Blue" (1:04)
 "Fate" (1:01)
 "Rules of the Pants" (3:26)
 "A Touch of Greece" (1:18)
 "Honey" (1:10)
 "The Traveling Pants" (:53)
 "Reflection" (2:07)
 "Running" (1:26)
 "Traveling to Baja" (:39)
 "The Way of the Pants" (:34)
 "Letter" (1:48)
 "Broken Heart" (1:16)
 "A Brave Soul" (1:15)
 "Last Words" (:58)
 "Us" (2:18)
 "Sisterhood Reunites" (1:14)
 "Together" (1:29)
 "The Traveling Song" (3:17)
 "Piano Suite" (4:03)

Awards

2006 – Won; Imagen Foundation Awards for Best Actress (America Ferrera)
2006 – Nominated; ALMA Award for Outstanding Actress in a Motion Picture (America Ferrera)
2006 – Nominated; Young Artist Award for Best Family Feature Film – Drama
2006 – Nominated; Young Artist Award for Best Performance in a Feature Film – Supporting Young Actress (Jenna Boyd)
2005 – Nominated; Satellite Award for Outstanding Actress in a Supporting Role, Comedy or Musical (America Ferrera)
2005 – Nominated; Satellite Award for Outstanding Youth DVD (Widescreen Edition)
2005 – Nominated; Teen Choice Award for Choice Movie Actress: Drama (Alexis Bledel)
2005 – Nominated; Teen Choice Award for Choice Movie Actress: Drama (Amber Tamblyn)
2005 – Nominated; Teen Choice Award for Choice Movie Breakout Performance – Female (America Ferrera)
2005 – Nominated; Teen Choice Award for Choice Movie Breakout Performance – Female (Jenna Boyd)
2005 – Nominated; Teen Choice Award for Choice Movie Breakout Performance – Female (Blake Lively)
2005 – Nominated; Teen Choice Award for Choice Movie Breakout Performance – Male (Michael Rady)
2005 – Nominated; Teen Choice Award for Choice Movie Hissy Fit (America Ferrera)
2005 – Nominated; Teen Choice Award for Choice Movie Love Scene (Alexis Bledel and Michael Rady)
2005 – Nominated; Teen Choice Award for Choice Movie: Drama

References

External links
 
 

2005 films
2005 comedy-drama films
2000s buddy comedy-drama films
2000s coming-of-age comedy-drama films
2000s female buddy films
2005 romantic comedy-drama films
2000s teen comedy-drama films
2000s teen romance films
Alcon Entertainment films
Alloy Entertainment films
American buddy comedy-drama films
American coming-of-age comedy-drama films
American female buddy films
American romantic comedy-drama films
American teen comedy-drama films
American teen romance films
Coming-of-age romance films
Films about vacationing
Films about virginity
Films based on American novels
Films based on young adult literature
Films directed by Ken Kwapis
Films produced by Denise Di Novi
Films scored by Cliff Eidelman
Films set in Greece
Films set in Maryland
Films set in Mexico
Films set in South Carolina
Films shot in Mexico
Films shot in Santorini
Films shot in Vancouver
The Sisterhood of the Traveling Pants (film series)
Warner Bros. films
2000s English-language films
2000s American films